Wellington Walter Nogueira (born January 19, 1994 in Boituva), known as Wellington or by his nickname Boituva, is a Brazilian footballer who plays for Associação Esportiva Jataiense as forward. He played in 2016 for Oeste in the Brazilian Série B due to a partnership between Audax and Oeste.

Career statistics

References

External links

1994 births
Living people
Brazilian footballers
Association football forwards
Grêmio Osasco Audax Esporte Clube players
Associação Atlética Francana players
Guaratinguetá Futebol players
Oeste Futebol Clube players
Tombense Futebol Clube players
União Recreativa dos Trabalhadores players
Campeonato Brasileiro Série B players
Campeonato Brasileiro Série C players
Campeonato Brasileiro Série D players